Mono's short-tailed bat (Carollia monohernandezi) is a leaf-nosed bat species found in Colombia and Panama.

References

Bats of South America
Mammals of Colombia
Bats of Central America
Carollia
Mammals described in 2004